Belinda Van Tienen (born ) is an Australian female weightlifter, competing in the 69 kg category and representing Australia at international competitions. She participated at the 2010 Commonwealth Games in the 69 kg event.

Major competitions

References

1986 births
Living people
Australian female weightlifters
Weightlifters at the 2010 Commonwealth Games
Commonwealth Games competitors for Australia
Place of birth missing (living people)
20th-century Australian women
21st-century Australian women